Nicola Piras (born 8 January 1991) is an Italian footballer who plays as a forward for Italian Serie D club Sambonifacese.

Career

Youth career
Born in Brescia, Lombardy, Piras started his career at F.C. Internazionale Milano. In 2003–04 season he was the member of Giovanissimi Regionali B under-13 team. In 2007–08 season he was the member of Allievi Nazionali under-17 team. He scored 4 goals in the half season, and transferred to Chievo on 30 January 2008 (around round 16, out of 26 rounds). He was the 8th goalscorer of Inter U-17 (ranked least among the forwards), behind Luca Tremolada, Sulaiman Sesay Fullah, Simone Dell'Agnello (permanently borrowed from Allievi Regionali), Davide Santon (winger), Diego Falcinelli, Mattia Destro (also lend to Primavera) and Renato Ricci (winger). Piras spent  seasons with Chievo, with the latter half in its Primavera under-20 team. Piras only able to play 10 times in 2008–09 season.

Senior career
At the start of 2009–10 season, Piras was loaned to Serie D team Villafranca, located in Villafranca di Verona, the Province of Verona. Piras was selected to national amateur under-18 team in 2010. After a successful season, Piras returned to professional football as Chievo sold him to Rodengo Saiano in co-ownership deal, for a peppercorn fee of €100. Piras only scored once in Lega Pro Seconda Divisione and only able to play 10 starts. In June 2011 Chievo gave up the remain 50% registration rights but the Rodengo–Saiano team withdrew from 2011–12 Lega Pro Seconda Divisione.

At the start of 2011–12 season Piras joined Carpenedolo and in December 2011 left for another Lombardy team Darfo Boario.

That season he scored 10 times in total in Serie D. In the postseason he was voted the 4th best born 1991 players of Serie D by the reader of Tuttosport.

Honours
Inter youth
Campionato Giovanissimi Nazionali: 2006
Campionato Allievi Nazionali: 2008

References

External links
 

Italian footballers
Inter Milan players
A.C. ChievoVerona players
A.C. Rodengo Saiano players
A.C. Carpenedolo players
Association football forwards
Footballers from Brescia
1991 births
Living people